Qasem Khan (also Romanized as Qāsem Khān) is a village in Azari Rural District, in the Central District of Esfarayen County, North Khorasan Province, Iran. At the 2006 census, its population was 308, in 81 families.

References 

Populated places in Esfarayen County